Asota heliconioides is a moth of the family Erebidae first described by Frederic Moore in 1878. It is found in the Philippines.

References

Asota (moth)
Moths of Asia
Moths described in 1878